Fanny Alaux nee Françoise Virginie Liégeois (April 17, 1797 – January 19, 1880) was a French artist known for her painting and drawing.

Biography 

Alaux married the painter Jean Alaux, with whom she formed part of dynasty of Alaux painters. She showed in the  Salons of 1839 to 1841. In 1841, she presented six pastel portraits.

Works 
 United States
 French embassy, Washington: Marie-Antoinette-Thérèse, princesse des Asturies (1784-1806).

 France
 Musée des Arts Décoratifs et du Design, Bordeaux :
 Portrait de femme, 1839, pastel (inv. 58.1.952); 
 Portrait de Pierre-Simon Jullien, 1842, pastel (inv. 58.1.1004);
 Portrait de Pauline Laurent, 1838, pastel (inv. 58.1.4354);
 Portrait de Thermidor Laurent, 1842, pastel (inv. 58.1.4355).
 Musée de l'Histoire de France (Versailles) : Pierre-Antoine-Victor de Lanneau de Marey (1758-1830), commissioned by Louis-Philippe for the historical museum of Versailles in 1840.

 Location unknown
 Portrait d'une femme au ruban, 1839, presumed work, portrait of de Madame Frédéric Louis Tattet (1768-1861).

References 

1797 births
1880 deaths
19th-century French women artists
19th-century French painters
Pastel artists
Painters from Paris